Jerónimo Miguel Neto a.k.a. Jojó (3 November 1967 – 15 January 2019) was a team handball coach.

Life 
He was the head coach of the Angola women's national handball team at the 1997, 2005 and 2007 World Women's Handball Championships in Stuttgart, Saint Petersburg and France and at the 2000 Summer Olympics in Sydney. Moreover, he won the African championships in 2006 and 2008 and the All Africa Games in 2007

The 7th place he achieved with the Angolan team at the 2007 world cup in France remains unbeaten to date.

Neto suffered a stroke in 2008 and died on 15 January 2019 of a heart attack. Shortly prior to his death and despite his heart condition, he was a regular participant at the year-end Luanda São Silvestre 10Km race, the last of which, on 31 December 2018.

References

1967 births
2019 deaths
Handball coaches of international teams